Stenelmis consobrina is a species of beetle from Elminae subfamily which can be found in France, Greece, Spain, Switzerland, Italy, and Sardinia.

References

Beetles described in 1835
Beetles of Europe